Fairfield is an unincorporated community in Covington County, Alabama, United States.

History
The community was likely named as a geographic descriptor. A post office operated under the name Fairfield from 1872 to 1903.

References

Unincorporated communities in Covington County, Alabama
Unincorporated communities in Alabama